Fungi are an important theme or working matter in art. They appear in many different artworks around the world, starting as early as around 8000 BCE. Fungi appear in nearly all artforms, including literature, paintings, and graphic arts; and more recently, contemporary art, music, photography, comic books, sculptures, video games, dance, cuisine, architecture, fashion, and design.

Contemporary artists experimenting with fungi often work within the realm of the BioArts and may use fungi as working matter. Artists may use fungi as allegory, narrative, or as props; they may also film fungi with time-lapse photography to display fungal life cycles, or try more experimental techniques. Artists using fungi may explore themes of transformation, decay, renewal, sustainability, or cycles of matter. They may also work with mycologists, ecologists, designers, or architects in a multidisciplinary way.

Artists may be indirectly influenced by fungi via derived substances (such as alcohol or psilocybin). They may depict the effects of these substances, make art under the influence of these substances, or in some cases, both.

By artistic area 
Traditionally, mushrooms have been the main subject for artistic depiction. Other forms (such as mycelia, hyphae, spores, molds, yeast, or lichen) is rare and usually in contemporary art. Often, artists focus on one major form of fungi (mushrooms, mycelia, hypha, spores, yeasts, molds, lichens) in the fungal lifestyle. It is rare for artwork to depict several forms of fungi (such as across the fungus reproductive cycle), except in non-fiction literature, documentaries, or participatory art.

Artistic genres that depict fungi include graphic arts, literature, cinema, architecture, and more recently contemporary art. Mycelia and hyphae are particularly common in contemporary art, fashion, design, and architecture due to their plasticity, elusiveness, and their numerous functions and effects. Spores or moulds are mostly used to depict or set the scene for infection or decay in literature or the visual arts.

In Western art, fungi have been historically saturated with negative associations, whereas Asian art and folk art is generally more favourable towards fungi. Reflecting these representations of mushroom, Western cultures have been referred to as mycophobes (fear, loathing, or hostility towards mushrooms), a term first coined as fungophobia by British mycologist William Delisle Hay in his 1887 book An Elementary Text-Book of British Fungi, whereas Asian cultures have been generally described as mycophiles.  Increasingly, however, fungi are depicted positively in the arts. For example:

 spore prints
 the musical theatre show The Mould That Changed the World
 Beatrix Potter's Victorian illustrations and children drawings
 the contemporary art exhibition Fermenting Futures, exploring the metabolic capabilities of yeasts.

With the ongoing surge of fungi in art (what some have called a "fungal renaissance"), more and more exhibitions, festivals, events, group activities, and citizen science projects are entirely devoted to fungi. These events often aim at presenting, discussing, growing, and experimenting with multiple forms of fungi as well as with different artforms, and are often visited or contributed to by a growing community of (amateur) mycologists, mycophiles, and experts. Since 2020, the annual Fungi Film Festival recognizes movies about fungi in all genres.

Themes that artists explore using fungi include:

 mysteriousness of mushroom appearance
 grotesque shape of many mushrooms
 invisibility of many fungal forms
 the plasticity of mycelial and hyphal growth
 the hallucinogenic effects of certain mushrooms
 the toxicity of some species
 the infectious potential of pathogenic fungi, including phytopathogenic or enthomopathogenic species
 the sustainability of biomaterials from fungi for a circular economy
 recent interest in fungi

In some stories or artworks, fungi play an allegorical role, or part of mythology and folklore. The visible parts of some fungi – particularly mushrooms with a distinctive appearance (e.g., fly agaric) – have significantly contributed to folklore.

Mushrooms 

Early examples of mushrooms in art include:

 Drawings of masked shamans with mushrooms sprouting from their heads, in Algeria
 Mushroom stones, in Guatemala 
 Petroglyphs of people with mushroom-shaped heads from the Bronze Age, near the Pegtymel River in Siberia. 

Contemporary artists are more interested in fungi than ever before. 

Given the mysterious, seasonal, sudden, and at times inexplicable appearance of mushrooms, as well as the hallucinogenic or toxic effects of some species, their depiction in ethnic, classic and modern art (around 1860–1970) is often associated in Western art with the macabre, ambiguous, dangerous, mystic, obscene, disgusting, alien, or curious in paintings, illustrations, and works of fiction and literature. British author Sir Arthur Conan Doyle wrote in his novel Sir Nigel:

 "The fields were spotted with monstrous fungi of a size and color never matched before—scarlet and mauve and liver and black. It was as though the sick earth had burst into foul pustules; mildew and lichen mottled the walls, and with that filthy crop Death sprang also from the water-soaked earth."

In Asian or folk art, mushrooms are generally depicted in a more positive or mystical way than in Western art.

Graphic arts 

Visual artists representing mushrooms have been very prolific throughout history. Whereas examples before the 15th century are rare, examples abound from European visual arts from the 1500 onwards including periods as the Renaissance, the Baroque, Flemish, and Romantic periods. The Registry of Mushrooms in Works of Art, from the North American Mycological Association, curates an extensive virtual collection of mushrooms in the visual arts.

The shaggy ink cap (Coprinus comatus) and the common ink cap (Coprinus atramentaria) mushrooms produce spores by melting their cap into a black ink, which can be used in drawing, illustration, and calligraphy.

Prehistoric art 

Mushrooms, and in particular fungi with psychoactive properties, have influenced cultures across the globe since millennia as entheogens.

Paintings, tapestries, and illustrations 
  Artists, painters, illustrators, naturalists and scientists have depicted mushrooms in their artworks for millennia. Edible species like Caesar's mushroom (Amanita caesarea) and the King bolete (Boletus edulis) are more commonly depicted than toxic ones. Mushrooms abound in Italian, Flemish, Germanic, and Dutch Baroque landscapes and still lifes. Landscape paintings involving mushrooms occasionally depict mushroom or truffle hunting. 

Whereas historical British artworks tend to be considered to be influenced by a 'mycophobe' attitude, 19th century Victorian fairy paintings depicting imaginary scenes involving fairies and other fantastic creatures often featured mushrooms. A great number of Victorian era illustrators and children-book authors depicted mushrooms in their artworks, including Beatrix Potter, Hilda Boswell, Molly Brett, Arthur Rackham, Charles Robinson, and Cicely Mary Barker.

Visual artists who depicted mushrooms include:
 Lewis David von Schweinitz (1780–1834): illustrations of over 1000 fungal species which along with his contribution to mycology earned him the title of "Father of North American Mycology". Hundreds of his paintings have been digitized by the Academy of Natural Sciences of Drexel (Philadelphia).
 Charles Tulasne (1816–1884): illustrations of fungi in the book Selecta Fungorum Carpologia (1861–65). 
 Mary Elizabeth Banning (1822–1903): 
 Ernst Haeckel (1834–1919): illustrations of basidiomycota, ascomycota, lichens in Kunstformen der Natur (1904). 
 Violetta White Delafield (1875-1949): creations of around 600 illustrations of fungi.

Photography 
Amateur and professional photographs of mushrooms abound on the Internet. Non-fiction books about fungi, especially those involving identification of fungi, often include photographs of fungal species and their fruiting bodies. The book by Scott Chimileski and Roberto Kolter Life at the Edge of Sight: A Photographic Exploration of the Microbial World showcases 'the invisible world waiting in plain sight,' including fungi. Since 2005, the North American Mycological Association (NAMA) organises an annual Photography Art Contest on mushrooms and fungi.

Literature

In fiction 

Work of literary fiction involving mushrooms and fungi are often linked to infection, decay, toxicity, mystery, fantasy, and ambiguity, and thus have mostly a negative connotation. Examples of mushrooms depicted or involved in a positive way include:

 the children's book The Wonderful Flight to the Mushroom Planet (1954) by Eleanor Cameron
 the science-fiction novel Omnivore (1968) by Piers Anthony (part of the Of Man and Manta trilogy)
 The Way Through the Woods: On Mushrooms and Mourning (2019) by Long Litt Woon.

In line with the assumption that Russian society traditionally has more affinity to mushrooms, a scene of mushroom foraging in Leo Tolstoy's Anna Karenina is associated with love, family, and a sense of commonality. During the Victorian era, fungi started to acquire a more playful, childish, or jolly role in works of literary fiction. The author, artist, illustrator, and mycologist Beatrix Potter created meticulous and accurate illustrations of mushrooms, including in her children-book series of Peter Rabbit.

Authors who have used fungi as a plot device include:

 Percy Shelley
 Alfred Tennyson
 Sir Arthur Conan Doyle
 D.H. Lawrence
 H.G. Wells
 Ray Bradbury

Fungi are a common trope in science fiction, horror, supernatural, fantasy and crime fiction. In Ray Bradbury's "Come into My Cellar", mushrooms are alien invaders threatening society. The short story is one of the rare examples in which several forms of fungi appears (spores and mushrooms): In the story, an alien form of spores from fungi lands on Earth and compels humans, and kids in particular, to grow mushrooms and infect more persons, thus using humans as a medium of propagation of fungi through mind control. Fungi have occasionally appeared in the murder mystery literature due to their toxicity. Crime and detective writer Agatha Christie has repeatedly used mushrooms as murder weapon in her crime fiction. 

The use of (toxic) mushrooms in fiction do not often reflect reality, either because a misidentified species is used (for example, a non-toxic one), because the preparation or intake of the toxic is wrong (for example, when not enough toxin is present, or when it should be deactivated by cooking), or because the progress of poisoning is unrealistic (for example, if the toxin kills too quickly).

The "Bad Bug Bookclub" at Manchester Metropolitan University is a regular book club run by Joanna Verran that discusses literary works on microorganisms, including fungi. The quarterly periodical FUNGI Magazine runs a regular feature called Bookshelf Fungi reviewing fiction and non-fiction books on fungi.

In poetry 
In Western culture poetry, as in literature, fungi are historically associated with negative feelings or sentiments, although, together with the rising popularity of fungi, this trend might hold less true in recent years. The poem The Mushroom (1896) by Emily Dickinson is unsympathetic towards mushrooms. American author of weird horror and supernatural fiction H. P. Lovecraft created a collection of cosmic horror sonnets with fungi as subject called Fungi from Yuggoth (1929–30). Margaret Atwood's poem Mushrooms (1981) explores the topics of the life cycle and nature. The poem by Neil Gaiman, The Mushrooms Hunter, is a poem touching, through the lens of mushroom hunting throughout history, on the topics of womanhood, human creation, and destruction. The poem was written for 'Universe in Verse,' a festival combining science with poetry, and won the Rhysling Award for best long poem in 2017. The poem features in a short animated video with the voice-over of Amanda Palmer.

Several hundred Japanese haiku are about mushroom hunting. Many of them were written by poets of the Nara, Edo and Meiji periods, such as:

 Matsuo Bashō (1644–1694)
 Kitamura Koshun (1650–1697)
 Mukai Kyorai (1651–1704)
 Naitō Jōsō (1662–1704)
 Hattori Ransetsu (1654–1707)
 Takarai Kikaku (1661–1707)
 Hirose Izen (1688?–1711)
 Morikawa Kyoriku (1656–1715)
 Yamaguchi Sodō (1642–1716)
 Kagami Shikō (1665–1731)
 Kumotsu Suikoku (1682–1734)
 Kuroyanagi Shōha (1727–1772)

Storytelling, oral tradition, myth, and folklore 
Through storytelling and oral tradition, fungi have influenced mythology, folklore, and religions across civilizations and historical periods. The psychoactive properties of certain fungi have contributed to the involvement of fungi in myth and folklore. Some writers argue that fungi have inspired numerous myths, and vice versa that many myths can be re-interpreted through the lens of fungal ecology. In her essay Jesus if a Fungal God, author Sophie Strand writes:

 "As we learn more about fungi, let us embrace that they have always been here. Beneath our feet. And inside our most popular myths.".

Occasionally, the involvement of fungi in myth and folklore is driven by allegory, cultural practices, or popular interpretations. For example, there are numerous deities associated with wine and beer, which can be regarded as an indirect effect of fungi in the arts. Fungi play a conspicuous role in several religions, for example through fermentation (e.g. wine) and leavening (e.g. bread). In the Parable of the Leaven, one of the Parables of Jesus, the growth of the Kingdom of God is akin to the leavening of bread through yeast. According to Matthew 13:33 (and, similarly, to Luke 13:20-21):

 "He told them still another parable: 'The kingdom of heaven is like yeast that a woman took and mixed into about sixty pounds of flour until it worked all through the dough.'"
However, yeast is associated with corruption in other passages of the New Testament, as in Luke 12:1:

 "Jesus began to speak first to his disciples, saying: 'Be on your guard against the yeast of the Pharisees, which is hypocrisy.'"
Mead, the result of fermenting honey, also appears in mythology. 

Some scholars argue that the Egyptian God of the afterlife Osiris is a personification of entheogenic mushrooms. As evidence, they indicate that Egyptian crowns are shaped like primordia of Psilocybe cubensis mushrooms. The Egyptian tale known as Cheops and the Magicians illustrates the growth of mushrooms on barley. In the Chinese classic tale The Mountain and the Sea, the soul of a young woman becomes a mushroom as a symbol of immortality. In Lithuanian and Baltic mythology, fungi are considered the fingers of Velnias, the God of the underworld, reaching up from the underground to feed the poor. In Slovenia, there is a folk ritual to roll on the ground during thunder as a way to increase the amount of mushrooms harvested. Baltic and Ugric religions include mushroom elements, including a "Mother of Mushrooms" (Sěņu māte). The popular  tale The War of the Mushrooms is a told in several Slavic cultures. (After the start of the 2022 Russian invasion of Ukraine, an exhibition at the Ukrainian Museum in New York revisited the classic story in light of current events.) The supernatural being Baba Yaga in Slavic folklore is often associated with mushrooms. In some Russian tales it often appears as a villainous wizard called Mukhomor, literally 'poison mushroom,' which is assumed to be derived from the fly agaric.

The fly agaric (Amanita muscaria) is a mushroom with characteristic red cap and white dots, and has greatly infiltrated folklore with mainstream popularity. 

According to several interpretations, the legendary figure of Santa Claus may have been influenced by the fly agaric; evidence includes the use by Saami shamans in the Lapland region, who would visit the homes of people by reindeer-drawn sleds and enter through the chimney when the entrance door was stuck by snowfalls; the fondness of reindeers in eating fly agaric mushrooms; the belief by Saami people that whoever eats an Amanita muscaria will resemble it, becoming among other things, plump and reddish; and the sense of flying that consumption of fly agaric might induce.

The stinkhorn Phallus indusiatus (or "veiled lady") has entered folklore across many cultures, probably due to its peculiar shape. In French, P. indusiatus is commonly called  ('the veiled satyr,' from the male nature spirit in Greek mythology).

Mushrooms have been used as an instrument for anti-Semitic discrimination or propaganda over the centuries. As Jews have a long tradition of eating mushrooms, which are considered Kosher in Jewish dietary law, mushrooms have been referred to as "Jew's Meat". This has a disparaging connotation, especially during the Middle Ages, when mushrooms where considered as toxic and disgusting. In the infamous 1938 children-book Der Giftpilz from Nazi Germany, Jews are depicted as poisonous and difficult to distinguish from 'Gentiles'.

Non-fiction books 

There is a large corpus of literature on mushrooms, including foraging, identifying, growing, and cultivating fungi. The book The Mushroom at the End of the World by Chinese-American anthropologist Anna Lowenhaupt Tsing on matsutake mushrooms offers insights into the cultural relevance and the significance of fungi for modern society, circularity, and decay. Some books proposed speculative or disputed theories on the cultural influence of fungi throughout history, like The Sacred Mushroom and the Cross by John Allegro, and were received critically by fellow mycologists. The online book club MycoBookClub discusses monthly a selection of mostly non-fiction books on fungi on Twitter. Authors of non-fictional books about fungi are often pioneers and contribute to the increased popularity, popularisation, and development of mycology, fungal ecology, mycoremediation, fungal conservation, biocontrol, medicinal fungi, mushroom gathering and identification, and fungal research.

Cinema, TV shows, and motion pictures 

Adaptations of literary fiction into motion pictures follow similar tropes present in science fiction, horror, supernatural, and crime fiction genres. Movies include the 2016 British post-apocalyptic science fiction horror movie The Girl with All the Gifts, based on the novel with the same title; and the 1963 Japanese horror film Matango (マタンゴ) directed by Ishirō Honda, partially based on William Hope Hodgson's short story The Voice in the Night (1907). The 2001 documentary Pegtymel, by director Andrei Golovnev, shows the daily life of Chukchi indigenous reindeer herders on the Pegtymel River. The Netflix documentary Fantastic Fungi (2019), primarily led by mycologist Paul Stamets, presents the world of fungi using time-lapse photography. The documentary The Mushroom Speaks (2001) by Marion Neumann covers topics such as decay, bioremediation, and symbiosis by following scientists, experts, and fungal pioneers.

Film festivals dedicated to fungi include the Fungi Film Festival (since 2021), by Radical Mycology author Peter McCoy; and the UK Fungus Day Film Festival (since 2022), by the British Mycological Society.

Topics and themes present at the 2022 Fungi Film Festival are personification of mushrooms, experimental/conceptual representation of fungal forms, and utilization of mushrooms for their hallucinogenic properties.

Performing arts 
The American stand-up comedian and satirist Bill Hicks drew inspiration from Terence McKenna's 'Stoned Ape Theory' (that psilocybin was crucial in the development of human nature) in his 1993 show Revelation.

Comic books and video games 
In The Smurfs, smurfs inhabit houses resembling mushrooms. American fantasy and science fiction comic book artist Frank Frazetta illustrated the cover image of the 1964 edition of the novel The Secret People (1935) by John Beynon (pseudonym of John Wyndham), in which fictive 'little people' inhabit areas with giant mushrooms. Game designer Shigeru Miyamoto acknowledged Lewis Carroll's Alice in Wonderland as direct influence for the 'super mushroom' in developing Nintendo's Super Mario video game. The video game franchise The Last of Us is set in a post-apocalyptic United States, after spores of a mutant fungus wiped off humanity, turning infected into zombies. Other video games where mushrooms appear include Skyrim (2011), Stardew Valley (2016), and Zelda: Breth of the Wild (2017).

Music 
Mushrooms have an influence in music as subject, cultural reference, or as medium for music creation. Numerous musicians, bands, composers, and lyricists mentioned or drew inspiration from fungi. A music gerne called Fungi from the British Virgin Islands is defined as a mixture of many styles and instruments. Music can be created utilizing fungi, as in the process of bio-sonification. The Czech composer and mycologist Václav Hálek (1937–2014) claimed to have created numerous musical works inspired by fungi. American composer John Cage (1912–1992) was an enthusiastic amateur mycologist and co-founder the New York Mycological Society.

Music inspired by 
Numerous musicians, bands, composers, and lyricists mentioned or drew inspiration from fungi, like the Israeli psychedelic trance band Infected Mushroom, the US heavy metal band Mushroomhead, Russian romantic composer Modest Mussorgsky's (1839-1881) song Gathering Mushrooms, Igor Stravinsky's (1882-1971) How the Mushrooms went to War, and many more. In Women Gathering Mushrooms, the musicologist Louis Sarno (1954-2017) recorded women from the Central Africa Mbenga pygmy tribe of the Aka (also Biaka, Bayaka, Babenzele) singing while collecting mushrooms, resulting in a polyphonic composition. According to mycologist and author Merlin Sheldrake, the activity of the gatherers above ground mirrors the fungal life below ground, as "mycelium is polyphony in bodily form". Icelandic avant-guard musician Björk's 2022 album Fossora (including tracks such as Mycelia, Sorrowful Soil, and Fungal City) is referred to as her "mushroom album". 'Fossora' is the feminine declination of the Latin fossore, meaning "she who digs". The rap artists 'FungiFlows' composes lyrics inspired by fungi and mushrooms while wearing a fly-agaric-shaped hat. The Czech composer and mycologist Václav Hálek (1937-2014) stated to have composed over 1,500 symphonies inspired by fungi, including the composition called Mycosymphony.

A non-exhaustive list of songs inspired by mushrooms (fungi) is given below:
 Mushroom Cantata by Lepo Sumera
 Mycosymphony by Václav Hálek
 Solar Waltz (2018) by Cosmo Sheldrake
 Fungus (2021) by The Narcissist Cookbook
 Mycelia (2022) by Björk
 Fungal City (2022) by Björk

Music created with 
Fungi are occasionally a direct medium for the creation of music. With the use of sonification and synthezisers, musicians and bioartists are able to create sounds and music by converting mushrooms bioelectric signals. The 'Nanotopia Midnight Mushroom Music' is a radio station devoted to streaming mushroom-generated music. Some artists creating music by sonificating mushrooms note that different mushrooms produce different sounds: for example, Ganoderma lucidum produces melodic sounds, while Pleurotus ostreatus produces constant sounds.

Architecture and sculptures 

In architecture and sculpture, mushrooms are mostly represented or showcased. Mushrooms are carved in buildings or depicted in sculptures or potteries, like pre-Columbian pottery mushrooms from Mesoamerica. At the entrance of Park Güell by Catalan modernist architect Antoni Gaudí (1852-1926), the Porter's Lodge pavilion features a lookout tower with a mushroom-shaped dome, probably inspired by Amanita muscaria or by stinkhorns. The sculpture Triple Mycomorph by Bernard Reynolds (1915–1997) at Christchurch Mansion holds resemblance with the stinkhorn mushroom Phallus indusiatus. Mushrooms are occasionally showcased by artists who collect, manipulate, preserve, and exhibit them, as in the 'Mind The Fungi' exhibition (2019-2020) at Futurium in Berlin (Germany).

The mycologist William Dillon Weston (1899-1953) created glass sculptures of microfungi, mostly plant pathogens, to fight bouts of insomnia. The artworks represent either magnified fungi (usually up to 400X times for fungi; up to 1200X for spores) or real-size plants affected by fungi (like in Ustilago maydis and Phytophthora infestans) and are made of transparent or opaque glass, although coloured glass was used when needed. The sculptures are mostly between 5–20 cm in size and often do not have a base and stand on the mycelium. Almost a hundred glass sculptures are conserved at the Whipple Museum in Cambridge (UK). Fungi represented are among others species from the genera Alternaria, Botrytis, Penicillium, Cordyceps, Sclerotinia, Fusarium, Puccinia as well as spores (ascospores, basidiospores). The other known example of glass sculptures representing (among others) fungi is the Blaschka Glass Flowers at Harvard Museum in Cambridge, Massachusetts (US).

Culinary arts 
Fungi enter cuisine mostly as fruiting bodies (mushrooms). Mushrooms are a source of protein in diet and a staple in many cultures and cuisines, and a common ingredient in many recipes worldwide. The North American Mycological Association (NAMA) hosts a series of resources to encourage all aspects of 'mycophagy.' Most mushrooms sold commercially are the button mushroom (Agaricus bisporus), commonly known as champignons. Many mushrooms, including some coveted in haute cuisine, like truffles and boletus, cannot be cultivated and need to be harvested. Due to their dietary properties and their suitability as meat substitute, mushrooms can be considered a novel culinary trend, including the cultivation and consumption of species which only recently became popular in cooking, like Cordyceps. Many fungi are considered delicacies in cuisine and gastronomy. Truffles, which are occasionally confused with tubers (storage organs in plants, like potatoes), are subterranean fruiting bodies (that is, mushrooms which grow below ground) of certain fungi belonging to the genera Tuber, Geopora, Peziza, Choiromyces, and others. Truffles have developed a distinctive aroma as spore-dispersion strategy: Instead of relying on wind and other mechanical means, truffles attract animals which eat them and carry their spores to new locations after defecation. The 'Shaggy ink cap' mushroom Coprinus comatus produces spores by deliquescing (liquefying, or melting) its cap into a black ink. Both the mushroom and the black ink of C. comatus and Coprinopsis atramentaria (the 'Common ink cap') are edible, but adverse effects might be felt if consumed together with alcohol. For this reason, C. atramentaria is also called "tippler's bane".
Corn smut (Ustilago maydis) is a plant pathogen infecting maize and teosinte. The delicacy is actually the gall (a tumor-like growth on the infected plant) induced during the fungus infective cycle, rather than a fungus fruiting body. The fungus infection gives the plant a 'mushroomy' taste, and it is used in Mexico as the delicacy huitlacoche, eaten usually as a filling in quesadillas.

Contemporary arts 
Contemporary artworks involving fungi usually handle or utilize mycelia, yeasts, and other fungal forms rather than mushrooms.  Fungi are occasional used conceptually (that is, to communicate their capabilities and potential). The video and light artist Philipp Frank creates so called 'projection mapping' by casting light effects on mushrooms growing in nature in the 'Funky Funghy' project.

Social games (board games, card games) 
Plant pathology scientist Lisa Vaillancourt at the University of Kentucky developed a 'Fungal Mating Game' based on standard card decks as educational tool for students to better understand the process and concept of fungal mating using as example mating of Saccharomyces cerevisiae (baker's yeast), Neurospora crassa, Ustilago maydis, and Schizophyllum commune. The game can be played both collaboratively and competitively.

Counterculture 

Mushroom-inspired counterculture in the years 1960-70 coincided with the popularity of hallucination-inducing substances present in certain fungi (e.g. Psilocybe species) and the widespread use of the psychedelic drug lysergic acid diethylamide (LSD) in certain social and cultural circles, ensuing policy backlashes, and a general restriction towards the diffusion, popularity, and knowledge about psilocybin and its derivatives. Advocates and pioneers in the research on the effects of LSD and other psychoactive substances (including certain mushrooms) like the Swiss chemist Albert Hofmann advocated for caution and against a ban on such psychoactive substances, arguing in favour of research elucidating the effects and therapeutic potentials of fungi-derived psychoactive substances. Current research on psychoactive mushrooms shows promises for the treatment of mental-health ailments like chronic depression and anxiety.

A 'mushroom counterculture' has been often fuelled by eccentric, unorthodox, and unfalsifiable hyphotheses and interpretations of the influence of (hallucinogenic) mushrooms in culture developments, as in the 'Stoned Ape Theory' by Terence McKenna (arguining that human conscience evolved following consumption of psychoactive mushrooms by our primate ancestors) or as in the book The Sacred Mushroom and the Cross by John Allegro (arguing that Christianity arose as a cult venerating and practising ingestion of psychoactive mushrooms). In his book Food of the Gods, Terence McKenna presents the hypothesis that art itself (along with human language and consciousness) arose from consumption of psychoactive musrooms; McKenna hyphotesis has been controversial, receiving negative appraisal as well as enjoying a cult following.

Several Mushroom festivals around the world, like the Telluride Mushroom Festival in Telluride, Colorado, the Radical Mycology Convergence in Mulino, Oregon,  feature and foster a community of practitioners involved with aspects of mushroom foraging, cultivation, cuisine, art, and local culture. Mycological Societies, groups, and associations often organises local event aimed at educating and engaging with the public, like the Transylvania Mushroom Camp in Romania.

Mycelia or hyphae 
When a fungal spore lands on fertile ground, it germinates into a hypha (plural: hyphae), a filament of cells exploring and growing into the surrounding substrate. Hypha are metabolic active, often septate (polynucleate) threads of cells, which entangle into dense fungal masses called mycelium (plural: mycelia). Both hyphea and mycelia are referred to as the vegetative parts of the fungus. The fungal vegetative stage involves growth and expansion, often isodiametrically (that is, in all directions, also referred to as concentric or radial growth), into the soil. Upon favourable conditions, the hyphae can develop into specialized structures, like mushrooms, to complete the fungus reproductive cycle. Further specialized hyphal structures are lamellae (gills below mushroom caps), sporocarps (spore-holding structures), haustoria (root-like structures penetrating deep into a substrate, like in the case of enthomopathogenic fungi infecting ants), sclerotia (hardened myclieum rich in food reserves allowing the fungus to go into dormancy), Hartig net (a network of hyphae in mycorrhizal fungi surrounding symbiotic plant cells), and many more.

Hyphae are the most metabolically active structures of fungi, secreting high amounts of digestive enzymes in the surrounding environment to consume the growth substratum, as well as bioactive metabolites, including substances used in modern medicine (antibiotic and antimicrobial drugs). Hyphae and mycelia grow by extension and branching, and fungi forming those structures are often referred to as 'filamentous fungi'. Mycelia and hyphae have seldomly been represented, showcased, transformed, or utilized in the traditional arts due to their invisible, ignored, and overlooked lifestyle and appearance. Depictions of mycelia and hyphae in the graphic arts are very rare. The mycelium of certain fungi, like those of the polypore fungus Fomes fomentarius which is sometimes referred to as Amadou, has been reported though history as biomaterial. More recently, hyphae and mycelia are used as working matter and transformed into contemporary artworks, or used as biomaterial for objects, textiles and constructions. Mycelium is investigated in cuisine as innovative food or as source of meat-alternatives like so-called 'mycoproteins,' enjoying increasing visibility, marketing, commercialization, and endorsement from celebrities. In literature and fiction, hyphae and mycelia are considered (if at all) for their intrinsic properties of decomposition, contamination, and decay. The filamentous, prolific, and fast growth of hyphae and mycelia (like moulds) in suitable conditions and growth media often makes these fungal forms good subject of time-lapse photography. Indirectly, psychoactive substances present in certain fungi have inspired works of art, like in the triptych by Hieronymus Bosch, The Garden of Earthly Delights, with curious and visionally imagery allegedly inspired by ergotism poisoning caused by the sclerotia (hardened mycelium) of the phytopathogenic fungus Claviceps purpurea.

Graphic arts 

The German Renaissance painter Matthias Grünewald (c. 1470–1528) depicted in The Temptation of St. Anthony (1512-1516) a sufferer from ergotism, also referred to as St. Anthony's Fire. Ergotism is caused by ingestion of sclerotia (hardened mycelium) of Claviceps purpurea, a fungal endophyte infecting rye and other plants. Ergotism is cause by consumption of rye and other food contaminated with the sclerotia of the fungus, as for example in flour. Bread from contaminated flour looks black due to the sclerotia. The mycelium contains the fungal alkaloid ergotamine, a potent neurotoxin which can cause convulsions, cramps, gangrene of the extremities, hallucinations, and further adverse and potentially lethal effects depending on dosage. Ergotamine is a precursor molecule in the synthesis of psychedelic drug LSD.

Literature 

Whereas non-fiction books about fungi often (if not always) include hyphae and mycelia, examples of hyphae and mycelia in literary fiction are much rarer in comparison to mushrooms and spores. When these fungal forms are included in work of fiction, they are often associated with elements of rot and decay.

Cinema, TV shows, and motion pictures 
Mycelia and hyphae are rarely a subject in cinema, TV shows, and motion pictures and appear less often than mushrooms or spores. This is generally not the case for movies presented at science- or fungi-themed festivals lik the Fungi Film Festival, where mycelia and hyphae are depicted, showed, or used experimentally or conceptually. Due to their fast, radial growth (also called isodiametric growth, that is, with same speed and size in all directions), as well as their biodegradation potential, mycelia and hyphae are often used as time-lapse photography to present filamentous growth and/or decay. The short movie Wrought (2022) by Joel Penner and Anna Sigrithur is a series of time-lapses exploring rot, fermentation and decay displaying moulds, yeasts, mushrooms, and further decomposers, with voice-over to describe the processes. The movie was awarded 'Best of the Fest' and 'Audience Choice' awards at the 2022 Fungi Film Festival.

Music 
Examples of hypha and mycelium influence in music are scarce. In her mushroom-inspired album Fossora (2022), Icelandic avant-guard musician Björk included tracks such as Mycelia and Fungal City. Fungi might have a direct influence on music instruments. The process of wood spalting is often used as aestetic element, e.g. in the manufacturing of guitar bodies. The luthier Rachel Rosenkrantz experiments with fungi (mycelium) to create 'Mycocast,' a guitar body made of fungal biomass due to the acoustic properties of mycelium and its growth plasticity (e.g. the ability to take virtually any shape upon being cast in a desired form). Violins from wood infiltrated by mycelia of the fungus Xylaria polymorpha (vernacularly called 'dead man's fingers') produce sounds close to those from the Stradivarius violin. Researchers are investigating the use of fungi to the species Physisporinus vitreus and Xylaria longipes in controlled wood decay experiments to create wood with superior qualitites for music instruments. In some cases, music generation using fungi is conceptual, as in Psychotropic house (2015) and Mycomorph lab (2016) of the Zooetic Pavillion by the Urbonas Studio based in Vilnus (Lithuania) and Cambridge (Massachusetts), in which a mycelial structure is designed to act as amplifier for sounds from nature mixd into loops.

Architecture, sculptures, and mycelium-based biomaterials 

Direct applications of fungi in architecture (as well as design and fashion) often starts with artistic experimentations with fungi. Mycelium is being investigated and developed by researchers and companies into a sustainable packaging solution as alternative to polystyrene. Mycelium as working matter in sculptures is attracting interest from artists working in the contemporary arts.

Early experimentations of artist with mycelia have been exhibited at the New York Museum of Modern Art. Experimentations with fungi as components – and not only as contaminant or degraders of buildings  – have started around 1950. Current collaborations between scientists, artists, and society at large are investigating and developing mycelium-based structures as building materials. Use of fungi from the genera Ganoderma, Fomes, Trametes, Pycnoporus, or Perenniporia (and more) in architecture include applications such as concrete replacement, 3D printing, soundproof elements, insulation, biofiltration, and self-sustaining, self-repairing structures.

Beside the study of fungi for their beneficial application in architecture, risk assessments investigate the potential risk fungi can pose with regard to human and environmental health, including pathogenicity, mycotoxin production, insect attraction through volatile compounds, or invasiveness.

Fashion, design, and mycelium-based textiles 

Historically, ritual masks made of lingzhi mushroom (species from the genera Ganoderma) have been reported in Nepal and indigenous cultures in British Columbia. Currently, fungal mycelia are molded, or rather grown, into sculptures and bio-based materials for product design, including into everyday objects, to raise awareness about circular economy and the impact that petrol-based plastics have on the environment. Biotechnology companies like Ecovative Design, MycoWorks, and others are developing mycelium-based materials which can be used in the textile industry. Luxury fashion brands like Adidas, Stella McCartney, and Hermès are introducing vegan alternatives to leather made from mycelium.

The tinder polypore Fomes fomentarius (materials derived from which are referred to as  'Amadou') has been used by ancestral cultures and civilizations due to its flammable, fibrous, and insect-repellent properties.

Culinary arts 

Mushrooms are traditionally the main form of fungi used for direct consumption in the culinary arts. The fermentative abilities of mould and yeasts have a direct influence in an enormous variety of food products, including beverages such as beer, wine, sake, kombucha, coffee, soy sauce, tofu, cheese, or chocolate just to name a few. Recently, mycelium is increasingly being investigated as innovative food source. The Michelin-star restaurant The Alchemist in Copenhagen (Danemark) experiments with mycelium of fungi such as Aspergillus oryzae, Pletorus (oyster mushroom), and Brettanomyces with funding from the Good Food Institute, to create novel fungus-based dishes, including the creation of 'mycelium-based seafood' and the consumption of raw, fresh mycelium grown on a Petri dish with a nutrient-rich broth. The US-based company Ecovative is creating fungus-based food as meat alternative, including 'mycelium-based bacon.' The US-based company Nature's Fynd is developing various kinds of food products, including meatless patties and cream cheese substitutes, using the so-called 'Fy' protein from Fusarium.

Contemporary arts 

Hapha and mycelium gets increased attention in the contemporary art due to its growth and plasticity, and is occasionally the starting point for artworks in the contemporary art exploring the biological properties of degradation, decomposition, budding ('mushrooming'), and sporulation (spore formation and release). An early form of BioArt is Agar art, where various microorganisms (including fungi) are grown on agar plates into desired shapes and colours. Thus, the agar substrate becomes a canvas for microbes, which are an analogue to the artist's colour repertoire (palette). In agar art, fungi (and other microorganisms, mostly bacteria) assume different appearances based on intrinsic characteristics of the fungus (species, morphology, fungal form, pigmentation), as well as external parameters (like inoculation technique, incubation time or temperature, nutrient growth medium, etc.). Microorganism can also be engineered to produce colour or effect which are not intrinsic to them or are not present in nature (e.g., they are mutant from the wild type), like for example bioluminescence. The American Society for Microbiology (ASM) holds an annual 'Agar Art Contest' which attracts considerable attention and elaborate agar artworks. An early 'agar artist' was physician, bacteriologist and Nobel Prize winner Alexander Fleming (1881-1955).

The Folk Stone Power Plant (2017), like the Mushroom Power Plant (2019), by Lithuanian artist duo Urbonas Studio, are physical installations based on 'mycoglomerates,' that is an interpretation and representations of vaguely-described microbial symbioses aimed at energy production alternative to fossil fuel. The Folk Stone Power Plant is a 'semi-fictional' alternative battery installed in Folkestone (UK) during the Folkestone Triennale, aiming at a reflection about symbioses (both in nature and between artists and scientists) and about unconventional power sources. The design is based on drawings from polymath and naturalist Alexander von Humboldt (1769-1859), while the microbial power source, hidden within the stone, mirrors the largely unnoticed, yet crucial, contribution of mycelial networks (that is, mycorrhiza) in ecology.
In her work Linghzi Girl (2020) by Chinese-Canadian artist Xiaojing Yan, female bust statues cast with the mycelium of lingzhi fungus (Ganoderma lingzhi) are exhibited and left to germinate. From the mycelium-based sculptures sprout mushrooms, eventually spreading, once ripe, a cocoa-powder dust of spores on the bust, after which the sculptures are preserved by desiccation to stop the fungal cycle and maintain the artwork. Artist Xiaojing Yan thus explains the audience's reaction to her work:
 "The uncanny appearance of these busts seems frightening for many viewers. But a Chinese viewer would recognize the lingzhi and immediately become delighted by the discovery."
During an artist-in-residence project The colors of life (2021) at the Techische Universität Berlin (Germany), artist Sunanda Sharma focus on the biotechnology-relevant fungus Aspergillus niger, and visualises its black pigmentation through fungal melanin by means of video, photo, animation, and time-lapse footage. Within the same residence, the artist created an open source database The Living Color Database (LCDB), which is an online compendium of biological colors for scientists, artists, and designers. The Living Color Database (freely available at www.color.bio) links organisms across the tree of life (in particular fungi, bacteria, and archaea) with their natural pigments, the molecules' chemistry, biosynthesis, and colour index data (HEX, RGB, and Pantone), and the corresponding scientific literature. The Living Color Database comprises 445 entries from 110 unique pigments and 380 microbial species.

Spores 
Fungal spores are the equivalent of seeds in plants. As the reproduction and dispersal unit of many fungi, spores guarantee a wide dispersal in nature, as well as genetic variability, increasing individual fitness in nature. Mating by sexual reproduction in fungi results in the formation of mushroom (also called fruiting bodies), which are the structures bearing spores. Many fungi can reproduce and form spores asexually, as in the formation of asci (singular: ascus) in Ascomycetes or of conidiophores in moulds. Many fungi do not form spores but reproduce by budding like yeasts; other fungi like moulds forms so-called 'vegetative spores,' which are specialized cells able to withstand unfavorable growth conditions, as in black yeasts. Lichens also do not reproduce and disperse by sporulation.

Examples of fungal spores in the arts are rare due to their invisibility and difficulties to treat and manipulate as working matter. Notable exceptions are so called 'spore prints,' or glass sculptures by mycologist William Dillon Weston (1899-1953) representing magnified microfungi and spores (ascospores, basidiospores). Often, fungal spores are employed as an agent of infection and decay in literature and the graphic arts, whereas recently they are increasingly used in the contemporary art in a positive or neutral way to reflect about processes of transformation, interaction, decay, circular economy, and sustainability.

Graphic arts 

So called 'spore prints' are created by pressing the underside of a mushroom to a flat, white or coloured surface, to allow the spores to be imprinted on the sheet. Since some mushrooms can be recognized based on the colour of their spores, spores prints are a diagnostic tool as well as an illustrative technique. Several artists used and modified the technique of spore printing for artistic purposes. Mycologist Sam Ristich exhibited several of his spore prints in an art gallery in Maine around 2005–2008. The North American Mycological Association (NAMA) created a 'how-to guide' for people interested in creating their own spore prints.

The artwork Auspicious Omen – Lingzhi Spore Painting by Chinese-Canadian artist Xiaojing Yan creates abstract compositions resembling traditional Chinese landscapes by fixing spores of the linghzi fungus with acrylic reagents. The linghzi mycelial sculptures by Xiaojing Yan, including Linghzi Girl (2020) and Far From Where You Divined (2017) are allowed to germinate into mushrooms during exhibition, creating a dust of spores raining down on the female busts, children, deers, and rabbits. The artworks are then desiccated for preservation, stopping the fungal growth and the metamorphosis of the sculptures. Artworks as such, including growth of the fungus, an incontrollable transformation of the art object, and several forms in the fungal life cycle, are rare.

Literature 

Whereas non-fictional books about fungi cover spores in the context of fungal spore formation, dispersal, harvesting, or germination, works of literary fiction involving spores are generally linked to infection and decay, and thus have mostly a negative connotation. In stories where mushrooms are perceived or represented as threat, spores fulfill the same role. In the short story Come into My Cellar, by Ray Bradbury, for example, spores are depicted as an alien invasion.

Comic books and video games 
The critically acclaimed and commercially successful video game franchise The Last of Us by Sony Computer Entertainment (Part I, released in 2013; downloadable content adds-on The Last of Us: Left Behind, released in 2014; Part II, released in 2020) is a post-apocalyptic, third-person action-adventure game set in North America in the near future, after a mutant fungus decimates humanity. The 'fungal apocalypse' is inspired by the effect ant-pathogenic fungi like Ophiocordyceps unilateralis have on their insect preys. The fictional fungus infects humans by means of spore inhalation, after which the persons turn into zombie-like creatures progressing into incremental stages of infection to fungus-like humans. The infected persons develop cannibalism and can transmit the fungal infection to other humans by biting. In advanced stages of infection, so-called clickers have their body transfigured by the fungus, with polypore-like bulging on their heads and faces; having lost the ability to see, they locate their preys by echolocation. An important part of the plot of The Last of Us game franchise revolves around vaccines against the fungal disease; as opposed to vaccination against viral and bacterial pathogens, research on vaccines for human fungal diseases lags behind, with currently no vaccine available against human fungal pathogens. The Last of Us Part II has been awarded best video game of 2020 by The Game Awards. A television adaptation by HBO starring among others Pedro Pascal as Joel, Bella Ramsey as Ellie, and Nick Offerman as Bill, is due in January 2023. The comic strip by Dave Gibbon Come into My Cellar is based on Ray Bradbury's short story with the same name, where fungal spores are an alien entity taking over humanity by mind control, especially of children obsessed with growing mushrooms in their home basement. An adaptation into Italian appeared for the famous comic series Corto Maltese in 1992 with the name Vieni nella mia cantina.

Yeasts, moulds, or lichens 
Many fungi do not reproduce and disperse by spores. Instead, they live single-celled and reproduce by budding or fission as in yeasts, or live in a symbiosis with an algal or cyanobacterial partner as in lichens, which are obligate symbiotic organisms (that is, they cannot survive apart), growing very slowly, and dispersing by fragmentation into so-called 'propagules.' Moulds do form spores ('asexual spores') but no mushrooms, and grow into filaments (hyphae and mycelia) which thrive in moist environments and spoil food. Despite being unicellular, yeasts can reproduce sexually by mating. Alcoholic fermentation producing beer, wine, and spirit is mostly in the hands of the yeast Saccharomyces cerevisiae. Also called also baker's yeast, S. cerevisiae is the leavening agent in bread. Despite growing mostly in a unicellular (single-celled) fashion, upon certain external stimuli like nutrient limitation or starvation (in particular toward carbon and/or nitrogen sources), yeasts can assume a filamentous growth forming chains of elongated cells. The morphological switch from unicellular to filamentous growth is crucial for pathogenic yeasts, like for example in the opportunistic fungus (that is, present as commensal in the human gut microbiota and only become pathogenic under certain conditions, like a weakened host immune system) Candida albicans responsible for vaginal infection. Moulds, like those which spoils food, are major natural producers of antibiotics, like penicillin. Industrial production of chemicals like citric acid, or enzymes like lipases, is also largely in the hands of filamentous fungi and moulds like Aspergillus niger. Blue cheese is cheese ripened by the Penicillium roqueforti and other filamentous fungi. Yeasts, moulds, and lichens did not enter into the arts very often. Despite being distributed worldwide and extremely common (e.g. being responsible for fermentation and leavening in the production of wine, beer, bread, and fermented products like coffee, soy sauce, tempeh, and many more), their direct influence in the arts remains modest. Indirectly, yeasts have had a conspicuous influence in the art, as fermentation has contributed enormously to different cultures around the globe and across time; in La traviata (1853) by Italian opera composer Giuseppe Verdi, for example, one of the best-known opera melodies is 'Libiamo ne' lieti calici' (in English, translated into "Let's drink from the joyful cups"), which is but one of numerous brindisi (toast) hymn. Other testimonies of the indirect effect of yeasts in the arts are the numerous deities and myths are associated with wine and beer. The field of ethnomycology focuses more on the influence of psychoactive fungi on human culture rather than on aspects such as medicine, food production practices, or cultural influence in the arts. Time-lapses photography is a tool often deployed by artists to accelerate and depict fungal growth in the arts, in particular growth of filamentous fungi (mould, hypahae or mycelia). Aside from various illustrations, lichens are very seldomly represented in the arts to their slow growth as well as their frailty towards maniputation. Yeasts and moulds are often an agent of decay and contamination in the arts, whereas recently they are increasingly used in the contemporary art in a positive or neutral way to reflect about processes of transformation, interaction, decay, circular economy, and sustainability.

Notable examples of yeasts, moulds or lichens in the arts include:
 Ernst Häckel illustrations of lichens in Kunstformen der Natur (1904)
 Chemical compounds from some lichens are used as dying substances (this is also true for compounds derived  from mushrooms)
 In the science fiction novel Trouble with Lichen (1960) by John Wyndham, a chemical extract from a lichen is able to slow down the aging process, with a profound influence on society
 In Stephen King's horror short story Gray Matter (1973), a recluse man living with his son drinks a 'foul beer' and slowly transforms into an inhuman blob-like abomination that craves warm beer and shun light, and transmutes into a fungus-like fictional creature
 The short movie Who's Who in Mycology (2016) by Marie Dvoráková, a comedy which won numerous awards at international film festivals, involves 'a young trombone player [...] trying to open an impossible bottle of wine [...] and some mold gets in his way
 The novel Lichenwald (2019) by Ellen King Rice, author of 'Mushroom Thrillers' is a crime story involving lichens, dementia, and manipulations
 The Dutch textile artist Lizan Freijsen created the Fungal Wall for the microbe museum Micropia, together with TextielMuseum Tilburg, a wall-sized tapestry by tufting resembling mould growth
 From Peel to Peel project (2018) by biodesigner Emma Sicher, using metabolic properties of yeasts and bacteria to create cellulose from food waste as biodegradable packaging material
 In so-called 'mold paintings,' surfaces of buildings or sculptures are intentionally overgrown with moulds to create visually appealing effects
 The contemporary artist Kathleen Ryan creates oversized, composite sculptures of rotting fruits, like in the Bad Fruit series (2020)
 The short movie Wrought (2022) by Joel Penner and Anna Sigrithur is a series of time-lapses exploring rot, fermentation and decay displaying moulds, yeasts, mushrooms, and further decomposers

Performative arts (theatre, comedy, dance, performance art) 
The musical theatre show The Mould That Changed the World is a show running both in the US (in Washington, D.C. and Atlanta, Georgia) and the UK (in Edinburgh and Glasgow, Scotland) which centers around the life and legacy of Alexander Fleming, the Scottish discoverer of the antibiotic penicillin and 1945 Nobel Prize winner in Physiology or Medicine. Alexander Fleming discovered in 1928 during his work as bacteriologist that bacteria growing on a Petri dish were inhibited by a mould contamination, namely from a fungus of the genus Penicillium, from which the antibiotic name 'penicillin' derives. The story involves jumps in time to highlight the legacy of the discovery of antibiotics and is partly set during the Great War, when Alexander Fleming served as private, as well as the personification of some characters (e.g. Mother Earth). The musical has been developed for educational purposes to raise awareness against the tremendous, worldwide threat that the rise of antimicrobial resistance poses. The musical provides freely available teaching resources and has been developed with the participation of the British Society for Antimicrobial Chemotherapy (BSAC). The musical choir is composed of both professional singers and actors as well as health care professionals, lab technicians, and scientists, and is an example of an artistic project merging science and the arts.

The dance contest for scientists called 'Dance your Ph.D.' sponsored by the American Association for the Advancement of Science (AAAS) is an annual competition established in 2008 encouraging communication and education of complex scientific topics through interpretative dance. All scientific fields and area of research are covered (biology, chemistry, physics, and social science) and several contestant entries involved fungi, including some winners. The 2014 winner was plant pathologist and aerial acrobat Uma Nagendra from University of Georgia (Athens) with Plant-Soil Feedbacks After Severe Tornado Damage, a trapeze-circus dance representing the effect of  extreme environmental events (like tornadoes) on tree seedlings and the positive effect those events can have with regard to withstanding phytopathogenic fungi. The 2022 winner was Lithuanian scientist Povilas Šimonis from Vilnius University with Electroporation of Yeast Cells, a dance illustrating the effect of electroporation (a method involving pulses of electricity to deactivate cells, or make them more porous and prone to acquire extracellular DNA, a crucial step in genetic engineering) on yeasts.

Contemporary arts 
In the contemporary arts, works involving fungi are often interactive and/or performative and tend to transform and utilize fungi rather than merely represent and showcase them. In her work Myconnect (2013), bioartist Saša Spačal invites the audience to interact with the artwork, involving Shiitake (Lentinula edodes) or Oyster mushrooms (from the genus Pleurotus), which takes the form of a capsule connecting the human with the fungus on a sensory level. Bioartists use yeasts to provoke a reflection on genetic engineering. Slovenian intermedia artist Maja Smrekar's created yoghurt using a genetically-modified yeast with a gene from the artist herself in Maya Yoghurt (2012). The blogger and feminist Zoe Stavri baked in 2015 sourdough bread using yeast she isolated from her own vaginal yeast infection using a Dildo, which she then mixed with flour and water and let leaven, and finally ate. The activity, which she documented both on her blog posts and on social media, tagging it with the hashtag #cuntsourdough, caused a lot of discussion on social media, including repulsion, hate messages, and food safety concerns, as the practice did not involve axenic isolation of the leavening yeast; however, during baking, microorganisms present in dough are most probably heat deactivated and thus harmless. As the activist herself noted: "people have been making and eating sourdough [with wild yeasts] for millennia." People had experimented before with microorganisms from the vaginal microbiota to create food and incite a reflection on topic of food fermentation and female bodily autonomy and self-determination. In 2015, the Medical Doctor/PhD student Cecilia Westbrook fermented milk into yogurt using as starter culture from her own vaginal secretion, which she then ate. As opposed to Zoe Stavri's vaginal sourdough bread, the homemade yogurt relied on the fermentation properties of lactic acid baceria (e.g. lactobacilli), rather than yeasts (fungi); and, unlike bread, yogurt is a culture of living microorganisms. The praxis is thus considered a food hazard by the US Food and Drug Administration.

The exhibition Fermenting Futures (2022) by bioartists Alex May and Anna Dumitriu in collaboration with the University of Natural Resources and Life Sciences (BOKU) is an artwork which wants to make the audience reflect about the role of yeast biotechnology to confront global issues of contemporary society by culturing and showcasing fermentation flasks of Pichia pastoris for the bioconversion of carbon dioxide into the biodegradable plastics. The artwork The Bioarchaeology of Yeast recreates by moulding the biodeterioration marks left by certain yeasts, like black yeasts, on work of art and sculptures, and displays them as aestic objects, reflecting on the process of erosion; the installation Culture used CRISPR technology to confer to a non-fermenting strain of Pichia pastoris the ability to ferment and work as leavening agent as the baker's yeast. A team of artists and researchers developed novel art techniques using the model (that is, widely studied in laboratory research) mould Aspergillus nidulans. The artist-scientist team described the development of two new techniques: 'Fungal Dot Painting' and 'Etched Fungal Art.' In Fungal Dot Painting, akin to pointillism where small dots unite to compose an image, fungal conidia are inoculated into agar droplets which are then deposited on a dark surface of black acrylic glass for contrast, and incubated at the desired condition to allow fungal growth. In 'Etched Fungal Art', an acrylic glass surface modified by etching (lathing or printmaking) is poured over with a suspension of fungal conidia in an agar-based substrate, and then incubated to permit fungal growth into the etched channels. Both artforms allow for temporal dynamism, insofar being composed of living fungal organisms they change and evolve over time.

Other (non-fungal) examples: the slime mould Physarum polycephalum 
Physarum polycephalum is a slime mould (myxomycete) and not a fungus; however, it grows in a similar fashion as filamentous fungi and it is increasingly used by bioartists. Due to its complex problem-solving abilities, the slime mould is used to mimic or investigate human behaviours.

See also 
 Microbial art
 BioArt
 Mushrooms in art
 Human interactions with fungi
 Mycelium-based materials

References

Further reading

External links 
 The Registry of Mushrooms in Works of Art from the North American Mycological Association
 Mary Banning: Fungi of Maryland
 Digitized painting from Lewis David von Schweinitz (1780–1834) by the Academy of Natural Sciences of Drexel (Philadelphia)
 'Bad Bug Bookclub' by the Manchester Metropolitan University
 Quarterly periodical FUNGI Magazine running a regular feature called Bookshelf Fungi reviewing fiction and non-fiction books on fungi.
 Poem by Neil Gaiman, The Mushrooms Hunter, featured in a short animated video
 The online book club 'MycoBookClub' discussing monthly a selection of mostly non-fiction books on fungi on Twitter
 
 Documentary Pegtymel (2001) by director Andrei Golovnev
 Documentary The Mushroom Speaks (2001) by Marion Neumann
 Short movie Wrought (2022) by Joel Penner and Anna Sigrithur
 Short movie Who's Who in Mycology (2016) by Marie Dvoráková
 Fungi Film Festival
 UK Fungus Day Film Festival (since 2022) by the British Mycological Society
 Frank Frazetta's Cover image of the 1964 edition of the novel The Secret People (1935) by John Beynon
 The radio station 'Nanotopia Midnight Mushroom Music' devoted to streaming mushroom-generated music
 Resources to encourage all aspects of 'mycophagy' by the North American Mycological Association (NAMA)
 Telluride Mushroom Festival in Telluride, Colorado (US)
 Radical Mycology Convergence in Mulino, Oregon (US)
 Musical theatre show The Mould That Changed the World
 The Living Color Database available at www.color.bio
 Vera Meyer: Pilze zwischen Wissenschaft und Kunst (Fungi between science and art), BIOTOPIA, 2021
 Educational and field trip resources by the Fungi Foundation
 The Fungus Files aimed at educating children at elementary-school level by the North American Mycological Association (NAMA)
 Educational resources by the Mycological Society of America (MSA)
 The Society for the Protection of Underground Networks (SPUN) website
 Fungus Fest by the New York Mycological Society (NYMS)
 'The Art of Mushroom' exhibition
 'El Museo del Hongo' (The Fungus Museum)
 'Nature's Mysterious Networks: Mushrooms, Mycelia and Yeasts' at Groundwork Gallery in Norfolk (UK)
 'MUSHROOMS: The Art, Design and Future of Fungi' at Somerset House in London (UK); featured in Google Arts & Culture
 Visual Art Contests and Photography Contests by the North American Mycological Association (NAMA)
 The Fauna Flora Funga initiative
 UK Fungus Day by the British Mycological Society
 Massee Art Grant by the British Mycological Society

Fictional fungi
Topics in the arts
Biology and culture
Fungi and humans